Mark Popek (born August 31, 1990) is a former American football offensive guard. He was signed by the New York Jets as an undrafted free agent in 2013. He played college football at USF.

Early years 

He attended Plant City High School in Plant City, Florida. He was named 5A second-team all-state team.

College career 

Popek redshirted his freshman year in 2008. As a redshirt freshman, he was named to the All-Big East Freshman team after playing in twelve games, starting the Bulls' last five of six games. In 2010, he made four starts while playing in eight games for USF. Popek started all twelve contests at left tackle in 2011 and led the Big East conference in sacks allowed, giving up 1.3 a game. Prior to the start of the 2012 season, Popek was listed in the 2012 Outland Trophy Watch List. He went on to start nine games at both the guard and tackle positions but missed time due to an ankle injury. He was selected to the 2012 Second-team All-Big East team.

Professional career 

Popek signed with the New York Jets as an undrafted free agent on April 29, 2013. He was released on July 23, 2013.

References

External links 
USF Bulls bio

1990 births
Living people
Players of American football from Florida
American football offensive guards
South Florida Bulls football players
New York Jets players
People from Plant City, Florida